Enrique Rabinovich Pollack better known as Enrique Novi (born April 21, 1947, in Mexico City, Mexico), is a Mexican actor.

Filmography

Film

Television

References

External links 

1947 births
Living people
Mexican male telenovela actors
Mexican male television actors
Mexican male film actors
Mexican telenovela producers
Mexican people of Croatian descent
Male actors from Mexico City
20th-century Mexican male actors
21st-century Mexican male actors
People from Mexico City